Leonardo de Magistris (died 1554) was a Roman Catholic prelate who served as Bishop of Alessano (1551–1554) and Bishop of Capri (1540–1551).

Biography
On 13 February 1540, Leonardo de Magistris was appointed during the papacy of Pope Paul III as Bishop of Capri.
On 21 August 1551, he was appointed during the papacy of Pope Julius III as Bishop of Alessano. 
He served as Bishop of Alessano until his death in 1554.

References

External links and additional sources
 (for Chronology of Bishops) 
 (for Chronology of Bishops) 
 (for Chronology of Bishops) 
 (for Chronology of Bishops) 

16th-century Italian Roman Catholic bishops
Bishops appointed by Pope Paul III
Bishops appointed by Pope Julius III
1554 deaths